Short Pump is a census-designated place (CDP) in Henrico County, Virginia, United States. It is a suburb of Richmond, Virginia. The population was 24,729 at the 2010 census.

The original village of Short Pump is located at the intersection of Three Chopt Road (formerly known as Three Notched Trail), Richmond Turnpike and Pouncey Tract Road.  It was named for the short handled pump that was located beneath the porch of a tavern located there.  The tavern was built by Robert Hyde Saunders, a Revolutionary War veteran in 1815. This area was on the principal route between Richmond and Charlottesville, as well as other towns in the Blue Ridge Mountains. Thomas Jefferson, the Earl Cornwallis, the Marquis de Lafayette, General Peter Muhlenberg, Stonewall Jackson and Ulric Dahlgren all visited this area.

The crossroads was officially named Short Pump by 1853, according to a Henrico County map found in the Virginia Historical Society.

It has now become part of Richmond's Far West End. In 2003, developers opened Short Pump Town Center, an  open air shopping mall. Other shopping and living spaces include West Broad Village.

Short Pump is noted for its shopping centers, restaurants, skating rink, and bowling alley. The area is an edge city of Richmond.

Geography
Short Pump is bordered to the west by Goochland County, to the north by the Wyndham CDP, to the east by the Innsbrook CDP, and to the south by non-CDP land and by Tuckahoe.

Climate

Demographics

At the 2010 census, there were 24,729 people, 9,217 households and 6,483 families residing in the CDP. The population density was 76.7 per square mile (29.6/km2). There were 77 housing units at an average density of 32.5/sq mi (12.5/km2). The racial makeup of the CDP was 75.0% White, 5.70% African-American, 15.9% Asian, and 3.2% Hispanic or Latino.

There were 9,217 households, of which 31.9% had children under the age of 18 living with them, 60.3% were married couples living together, 10.1% had a female householder with no husband present, and 36.2% were non-families. 26.1% of all households were made up of individuals, and 8.7% had someone living alone who was 65 years of age or older. The average household size was 2.64 and the average family size was 3.30.

26.9% of the population were under the age of 18, 6.0% from 18 to 24, 33.5% from 25 to 44, 18.1% from 45 to 64, and 15.4% who were 65 years of age or older.

The median household income was $105,300 and the median family income was $117,995. The per capita income for the CDP was $46,047. 4.1% of the population lived below the poverty line.

Education

Elementary schools
 Colonial Trail Elementary School
 Rivers Edge Elementary School
 Gayton Elementary School
 Nuckols Farm Elementary School
 Short Pump Elementary School
 Twin Hickory Elementary School
 David A. Kaechele Elementary School

Middle
 Holman Middle School
 Pocahontas Middle School
 Short Pump Middle School

High
 Deep Run High School
 Mills E. Godwin High School

Boundaries of Short Pump
The boundaries of the Short Pump CDP start on the west at the Goochland County/Henrico County line, then proceed east on Kain Road to Pouncey Tract Road (Virginia State Route 271); north on Pouncey Tract Road to Shady Grove Road; east, then north, on Shady Grove Road to Nuckols Road; southeast and south on Nuckols Road to Interstate 295; southwest on I-295 to Interstate 64; southeast on I-64 to Cox Road; southwest on Cox Road to Three Chopt Road where Cox Road becomes Church Road; southwest, then west, on Church Road to Lauderdale Drive; southwest on Lauderdale Drive to Causeway Drive; northwest on Causeway Drive to its crossing of Wilde Lake; southwest through the center of Wilde Lake to its outlet, Harding Branch; westward down Harding Branch to its outlet at Tuckahoe Creek, which is the Goochland/Henrico County line; then north on the county line back to Kain Road.

References

External links
 www.henricohistoricalsociety.org — Short Pump Lost Architecture (2015). Henrico County Historical Society

Census-designated places in Henrico County, Virginia
Census-designated places in Virginia
Geography of Richmond, Virginia
Suburbs of Richmond, Virginia